Canada: The Great Experiment is an educational television show which was produced and broadcast by TVOntario in 1981–82. The series was narrated by Prime Minister John A. Macdonald, played by veteran actor Colin Fox.

Episode list

13 or 14 episodes were produced. They were:

 "Power Shift"
 "One Dominion"
 "The Reasons Why"
 "From Sea to Shining Sea"
 "For the Good of the Party"
 "The People's House"

The rest of the list is in an unknown order.

 "Of Limited Power"
 "The Decision Makers"
 "A Creature of the Province"
 "To Serve With Honour"
 "The Third Branch"
 "Pressure Point"
 "The Nation Within"

All episodes were around 30 minutes in length.

References

John A. Macdonald
TVO original programming
1981 Canadian television series debuts
Television series about the history of Canada
Studies of Canadian history
1982 Canadian television series endings
1980s Canadian documentary television series